The Handley Page Basic Trainer (H.P.R.2) was a British training aircraft of the 1940s. It was a single-engine, low-wing monoplane with a fixed tailwheel undercarriage.

Development
The H.P.R.2 was developed by Handley Page Reading Ltd as a basic trainer in response to Air Ministry Specification T16/48 for a trainer to replace the ageing Percival Prentice.

The Basic Trainer first flew in May 1950. Testing showed it to be a trickier and less forgiving aircraft than the rival Percival P.56. Although Handley Page were confident that the H.P.R.2 could be improved, the Air Ministry elected to order the P.56 into production as the Provost. Two prototypes (WE496 c/n HPR.142 and WE505 c/n HPR.143)  were built and flown but no orders resulted.

Specifications (Basic Trainer)

See also

References

Notes

Bibliography

 Barnes, C. H. Handley Page Aircraft Since 1907. London: Putnam & Company, Ltd., 1987. .
 Bridgman, Leonard. Jane's All The World's Aircraft 1951–52. London: Sampson Low, Marston & Company, Ltd, 1951.
 Clayton, Donald C. Handley Page, an Aircraft Album. Shepperton, Surrey, UK: Ian Allan Ltd., 1969. .

External links

1940s British military trainer aircraft
Basic Trainer